The Mayer Papyri  are two ancient Egyptian documents from the Twentieth Dynasty that contain records of court proceedings.

Papyrus Mayer A
The best known of the two is Papyrus Mayer A. It deals with court sessions held in the first two years of the Whm Mswt or Renaissance, an era which began in year 19 of king Ramesses XI.

A panel consisting of the vizier of the South and three high officials cross-examined suspects charged with tomb robbery at Deir el-Bahri (cf. also the Abbott Papyrus and the Amherst Papyrus). The interrogation of both suspects and witnesses was preceded by a bastinado and an oath in the name of the king was administered.

The confessions of the six suspects were corroborated by the testimony of the chief of police of the Theban Necropolis and other witnesses, among them the son of one of the thieves who had died in the meantime. This witness claims to have been a child at the time of the crime; still, he was beaten when he was being examined, as was a female witness.

While the ancient Egyptian judicial system was quite brutal and biased against the accused, a verdict of guilty was not a foregone conclusion: Papyrus Mayer A records the discharge of five men who had been found to be innocent.

Papyrus Mayer B
Papyrus Mayer B is a papyrus fragment, only inscribed on the recto. It consists of 14 preserved horizontal lines of hieratic script, in a form typical of the Twentieth Dynasty. Both its beginning and end are incomplete. It deals with the robbery of the tomb of king Ramesses VI, which is not alluded to in any of the other tomb-robbery papyri. No names of officials have survived in the extant part of the papyrus. Of the five thieves named, none can be identified with certainty. The coppersmith Pentahetnakht may or may not have been identical to the coppersmith Pentahetnakht, son of Kedakhtef, mentioned in Pap. BM 10054 as a member of a gang which was tried in year 16 of Ramesses IX.
It has been suggested that Pap. Mayer B may have been among the papyri summed up in Pap. Ambras, but this remains a mere hypothesis.

Cyril Aldred has pointed out that the coffer of the sarcophagus of Ramesses VI must have been removed relatively soon after the burial, because the sacramental oils had not yet had the time to solidify, but whether this was done during the pilfering by the thieves tried in Pap. Mayer B remains uncertain.

See also 
 List of ancient Egyptian papyri

References

Further reading

 Cyril Aldred, More Light on the Ramesside Tomb Robberies, in: J. Ruffle, G.A. Gaballa & K.A.. Kitchen (eds), Glimpses of Ancient Egypt, (Festschrift Fairman), Warminster 1979, 96-98
 James Baikie, 1925, Egyptian Papyri and Papyrus-Hunting,  Kessinger Publishing 2003, p. 110
 J.H. Breasted, Ancient Records of Egypt, Part Four, Chicago 1906
 T. E. Peet, The Mayer Papyri A & B, London 1920
 Kim Ridealgh, A Tale of Semantics and Suppressions: Reinterpreting Papyrus Mayer A and the So-called 'War of the High Priest' during the Reign of Ramesses XI, SAK 43 (2014), 359-373
 Ad Thijs, Reconsidering the End of the Twentieth Dynasty Part V, P. Ambras as an advocate of a shorter chronology, GM 179 (2000), 77-78

External links
The Mayer Papyri, accessed April 22, 2007
Review of: The Great Tomb Robberies of the Twentieth Egyptian Dynasty, Being a Critical Study, with Translations and Commentaries, of the Papyri in Which These Are Recorded by T. Eric Peet, accessed April 23, 2007

12th-century BC works
Theban tombs
Twentieth Dynasty of Egypt
Papyrus